Overboelare Airfield is a private use airport located near Geraardsbergen, East Flanders, Belgium.

See also
 List of airports in Belgium

References

External links 
 Airport record for Overboelare Airfield at Landings.com

Airports in East Flanders
Geraardsbergen